James L Rankin was a male badminton player from Ireland.

Profile
Rankin won the All England Open Badminton Championships, considered as the unofficial World Badminton Championships, in the men's doubles with Thomas Boyle in 1939.

He also won ten Irish Open titles.

References 

Irish male badminton players